Poorna Jagannathan is an American producer and actress of Indian descent. She is best known for her portrayal of Safar Khan in the HBO drama miniseries The Night Of, as well for her role as Nalini Vishwakumar in the Netflix teen comedy series Never Have I Ever by Mindy Kaling. She also co-conceived, produced and acted in the play Nirbhaya, written and directed by Yael Farber. Dealing with sexual violence, the play won the prestigious 2013 Amnesty International Award and was called by The Telegraph as the "One of the most powerful pieces of theater you'll ever see". It's also considered one of the most impactful moments in India's history of women's empowerment.

Early life
Her father, G. Jagannathan, was an Indian diplomat. Poorna was born on December 22, 1972, in Tunis, Tunisia and grew up in Pakistan, Ireland, India, Brazil and Argentina. She speaks Tamil, Hindi, English, Spanish and Portuguese. She attended the University of Brasília before graduating in journalism from the University of Maryland, College Park. On a scholarship, she began a Master of Fine Arts in acting at the Actors Studio Drama School at Pace University. Although she dropped out after the first year, she continued to study acting under her mentor, Elizabeth Kemp, whom she met there. Poorna went on to train at The Barrow Group where she is currently a board and company member and cites The Barrow Group as the place she learned how to become a professional, working actor. Before her career as an actor, Poorna spent 15 years working in advertising at agencies like TBWA\Worldwide, Ogilvy, and Deutsch Inc. before starting her own consultancy, Cowgirls & Indians.

Career
Poorna has appeared on several TV shows like Big Little Lies, Better Call Saul and Ramy. She played Blacklister #44 on The Blacklist, and appeared as the guest lead on Law & Order: Special Victims Unit for their 18th year's double-season-finale episodes. In 2017, she played one of the leads in A24's film Share. Share premiered at the 2019 Sundance Film Festival, winning Best Screenplay and Best Actor, and was immediately acquired by HBO.

Poorna also won critical acclaim for her role as a spunky, irreverent journalist in the 2011 Bollywood film Delhi Belly. The Village Voice said that "the most enjoyably subversive element is Poorna Jagannathan as the self-sufficient bachelorette who waylays Tashi on his way to the altar. Rangy, corkscrew-haired, with a wary demeanor that can't long be upset by anything, she's a happy departure from the usual run of Xeroxed, pedestaled beauties." Mumbai Mirror said, "Poorna Jagannathan, an offbeat choice, is remarkably subtle and does a brilliant job." The Daily News and Analysis said that Poorna shines in the film, and that "her bohemian sex appeal" is "a refreshing change from the prim and proper 'heroine' we are used to watching." The editor of Outlook Lounge said that Poorna's performance was a "masterclass in effortless acting". In 2019, Delhi Belly was named one of the top 25 Bollywood movies of the decade by FilmCompanion.

In 2012, Deadline.com reported that Poorna had joined the cast of the HBO show The Night Of as a series regular. Her performance in The Night Of received rave reviews; Vinnie Mancuso of Observer wrote, "Poorna Jagannathan, who has been putting in one of the year's most heartbreaking performances, continues to shine....." Vikram Murthi from Vulture wrote "Poorna Jagannathan's subtle performance really shines .... Her facial reactions convey such a profound array of emotions." Variety Sonia Saraiya wrote that her performance was "quietly devastating".

In September 2016, it was announced that Poorna had joined the cast of Gypsy as a series regular. The Netflix produced series was led by Naomi Watts but was not renewed for another season. In May 2018, Deadline announced that Poorna had joined the cast of the HBO series Big Little Lies as a recurring character named Katie Richmond.

Poorna's comic performance in Room 104 was widely praised by critics. Kathryn VanArendonk of Vulture wrote, "But Jagannathan's Divya is even better. Even without a physical presence, Divya is still immediately recognizable as a character. At times she's breezily unconcerned, at other moments, she's sharply chastising her son for his brusqueness. Her delivery is the bedrock of the episode's sense of humor."

She is currently a series regular on Mindy Kaling's Never Have I Ever, which debuted in 2020 and went on to win the People's Choice Awards for all three seasons consecutively. Poorna's performance as Nalini Vishwakumar was lauded by critics and her nuanced portrayal of an immigrant woman has been regarded as groundbreaking and a first for television. Sonia Saraiya from Vanity Fair said, "I’ve seen a lot of actors attempt to flesh out the stereotypically demanding Indian mom, but I’ve never seen anyone do it as well as Jagannathan does... It’s the little things: the nearly untraceable Indian accent, the mumbled exclamations in a different language, the slight gestures and paranoiac side-eyes of the Indian aunty, the seemingly effortless bridging of the paradox between ancient tradition and modern necessity." Jinal Bhatt from Mashable.com wrote, "Poorna Jagannathan has been a revelation in this series, and I’d say she puts forth one of the best portrayals of Indian-American mothers we’ve seen. Some of the #JustMomThings she says penetrate through the screen and hit you while you watch! But her dynamic with Devi is beautiful in the subtext." John Anderson from The Wall Street Journal said that she "is a hilarious mix of Indian tradition, widowhood, creeping Americanization and the flat delivery of a sentencing judge." Delia Cai from Vanity Fair says, "By following Nalini’s story beyond the basic assimilation arc and exploring her character via universal themes of parenting, loss, and intergenerational family ties, we get a fully three-dimensional character who is easily the best part of the show."

In 2018, Poorna lent her voice to three podcasts in the Good Night Stories for Rebel Girls series, based on The New York Times Best Seller list books by Elena Favilli and Francesca Cavallo. She read the stories of Mary Kom, Margaret Hamilton and Madam C. J. Walker. The series was named among the 50 best podcasts for 2018 by Time and won the 2019 People's Choice Podcast Award in the Education category.

Moved by a gang rape and murder in Delhi on December 16, 2012, Poorna initiated, produced and acted in a testimonial play called Nirbhaya (a pseudonym given to the victim). The play uses the rape and death of Jyoti Singh Pandey to break the silence around sexual violence. Poorna collaborated with internationally acclaimed playwright and director, Yaël Farber, to build the play. Nirbhaya opened at the Assembly Hall in August 2013 during the Edinburgh Fringe Festival. It won the coveted 2013 Amnesty International Award as well as the Scotsman Fringe First and Herald Angel Awards.and received excellent reviews from leading publications. The Sunday Herald called Nirbhaya "One of the most powerful and urgent pieces of human rights theatre ever made". In March 2014, Nirbhaya was the centerpiece performance for Southbank's "Women of the World" festival where it played to sold-out houses in the UK. After a successful Kickstarter campaign to fund an India tour, Nirbhaya opened to critical acclaim in India on March 17, 2014, playing to sold-out houses in Mumbai, Delhi, and Bangalore. In August 2014, The Guardian audiences voted Nirbhaya among the top 10 "best fringe moments" in the Edinburgh Festival's history. Nirbhaya opened to rave reviews at The Culture Project in New York City in May 2015, and rose to become The New York Times Critics' Pick. The play toured for three years in multiple cities in Ireland, Canada, the UK, India and the U.S. Many reviewers stated that it was one of the most political and deeply moving pieces of theater ever made. "Nirbhaya" is considered one of the most impactful moments in India's history of the women's empowerment movement.

Filmography

Film

Television

Accolades 

 For her performance in Delhi Belly, Jagannathan won the Stardust award for Best Supporting Actress and the L'Oreal Femina Award for Breakthrough Performance in 2012.
 She was named among the top 100 Most Impactful Asians in 2021 and 2022 by Goldhouse
 Jagannathan has been featured on the cover of Harper's Bazaar, Marie Claire, Femina, Jade and Exotica and covered in numerous publications like Vogue, Elle, Cosmopolitan and Grazia
 In 2014, Verve magazine named her among the top 50 most powerful women in India
 She was featured in Vogues October 2012 anniversary issue as one of 8 women who are changing the face of beauty in India
 Jagannathan was featured among the top 10 in Femina magazine's "India's 50 most beautiful women" in 2012
 Vogue included her in their list of most stylish women in 2012, 2014 and 2015
 Grazia awarded Jagannathan the "Best Dressed Award" for 2014
 She was ranked Most Fashionable Indian Woman by Cosmopolitan in their October 2013 and 2012 issues
 She was included in Verves "2012's Best dressed Women" issue
 Italian Marie Claire named Jagannathan as one of the 12 women from the East impacting Western cinema in 2012
 She was included in Elle magazine's hot 100 list for 2011
She is also a brand ambassador for People for the Ethical Treatment of Animals (PETA).

References

External links

 
 
 

Living people
People from Tunis
Actresses from New York City
Indian film actresses
Indian television actresses
Indian emigrants to the United States
American film actresses
American television actresses
American people of Indian Tamil descent
American actresses of Indian descent
American expatriate actresses in India
Actresses in Hindi cinema
University of Maryland, College Park alumni
Pace University alumni
21st-century Indian women
21st-century American women
21st-century American actresses
1972 births